Taron Egerton (born 10 November 1989) is a Welsh actor. He gained recognition for his starring role as a spy recruit in the action comedy film Kingsman: The Secret Service (2014) and its sequel Kingsman: The Golden Circle (2017). He has also starred in several biographical films, portraying military officer Edward Brittain in the drama Testament of Youth (2014), the titular ski-jumper in the sports film Eddie the Eagle (2016), and singer Elton John in the musical Rocketman (2019), the last of which earned him a Golden Globe Award for Best Actor. Egerton has since starred in the miniseries Black Bird and the West End theatre play Cock (both 2022).

Early life 
Egerton was born on 10 November 1989 in Birkenhead, Merseyside. His mother worked in social services, while his father ran a bed-and-breakfast near Liverpool; both of them are Liverpool natives. Although born in England, Egerton considers himself to be Welsh "through and through" and is fluent in both Welsh and English. His first name means "thunder" in Welsh. He has two younger half-sisters.

Egerton's parents divorced when he was two, and he subsequently moved with his mother to the Welsh island of Anglesey, where he went to primary school. The family then relocated to Aberystwyth when he was 12 years old. He became lonely due to losing childhood friends. He began acting at age 15, which he explained was "as much about trying to be social and make friends as it was an interest in acting". He attended the Royal Academy of Dramatic Art, from which he graduated in 2012.

Career

Early work and Kingsman films (2012–2018) 

Egerton performed in a stage production of the play The Last of the Haussmans at the National Theatre in London in 2012. After appearing in the crime drama series Lewis, he was cast as the lead in Matthew Vaughn's Kingsman: The Secret Service, an action comedy film adaptation of the comic book The Secret Service by Mark Millar and Dave Gibbons, in 2013. He portrayed British Army officer Edward Brittain in the 2014 biographical drama film Testament of Youth, earning a nomination for Best British Newcomer at the BFI London Film Festival. Kingsman: The Secret Service was released in 2015, garnering highly favorable reviews that described it as "fun, stylish and subversive" as well as grossing over $400 million. Writing for TheWrap, James Rocchi deemed Egerton to be "a naturally charismatic presence with smarts behind his smile" as Gary "Eggsy" Unwin, a recruit for an espionage organisation. Egerton rose to fame with the role. He starred in the crime film Legend that same year.

At the 69th British Academy Film Awards in 2016, Egerton received a nomination for the BAFTA Rising Star Award. In the same year, he played ski-jumper Eddie the Eagle in the eponymous biographical sports film and voiced Johnny, a passionate gorilla, in the animated musical film Sing. Egerton reprised the role of Eggsy in the film Kingsman: The Golden Circle, a sequel to Kingsman: The Secret Service, released the following year. It drew a mixed response from critics. In 2018, he starred in the crime drama film Billionaire Boys Club and played the title character in the action-adventure film Robin Hood. Both films were failures commercially and with critics. Egerton later specified that Robin Hood was not the film he had signed up to create and that it had "lost its vision." He attributed his involvement in Billionaire Boys Club and Robin Hood to monetary reasons.

Recognition (2019–present) 
Egerton starred as singer Elton John in the biographical musical film Rocketman. He learned to play the piano for the part and sang live in each take during filming. The film was released in May 2019, receiving positive reviews, and the actor's portrayal of John earned praise. The Washington Posts Ann Hornaday opined that Egerton "exerts a steadying, singularly charismatic force" in the role, while Richard Lawson of Vanity Fair described his portrayal as "nuanced and emotionally intelligent while still loose, carried with verve and agility". Egerton won the Golden Globe Award for Best Actor – Motion Picture Musical or Comedy for his performance. He also garnered a British Academy Film Award nomination for Best Actor in a Leading Role and a Grammy Award nomination for Best Compilation Soundtrack for Visual Media for his work on the film's soundtrack. That same year, Egerton narrated the audiobook version of John's autobiography, Me, and the two performed on stage together several times.

Also in 2019, Egerton voiced Moomintroll in the animated series Moominvalley and Rian in the fantasy series The Dark Crystal: Age of Resistance. He reprised the role of Johnny in Sing 2, which released December 2021. Egerton starred in the play Cock by Mike Bartlett. Directed by Marianne Elliott and held at the Ambassadors Theatre in the West End, the production marked his West End debut. After missing performances due to fainting on stage during the first night of performances in March 2022 and testing positive for COVID-19 later that month, Egerton exited for "personal reasons" the following month. The production of Cock garnered mixed critical reception, with Egerton's performance gaining praise. The Guardians Arifa Akbar wrote he "is especially affecting in his romantic desperation".

Egerton executive produced and portrayed American drug dealer Jimmy Keene in the miniseries Black Bird, an adaptation of Keene's memoir In with the Devil. It premiered on Apple TV+ in July 2022. Reviewing the series, Saloni Gajjar of The A.V. Club found that Egerton "aces Jimmy's duality while switching from being overtly confident to silently breaking down". Egerton is set to play entrepreneur Henk Rogers in the biographical film Tetris and return as Eggsy in the fourth installment in the Kingsman film franchise. He is attached to star in the thriller film Carry-On.

Public image and personal life 
Egerton was named one of British GQ 50 best-dressed British men in 2015 and 2016.

Egerton lives in West London. He describes himself as having come from a working-class background. Having lost a grandmother to motor neurone disease, he is an ambassador for the Motor Neurone Disease Association. He supports gay rights.

Acting credits

Film

Television

Theatre

Music videos

Audio

Discography

Soundtrack albums

Guest appearances

Accolades 

Egerton has won a Golden Globe Award for his role in Rocketman. He has also garnered a Grammy Award nomination for his work on its soundtrack. He has been nominated by the British Academy of Film and Television Arts for the BAFTA Rising Star Award and the BAFTA Award for Best Actor in a Leading Role.

References

External links 

 
 

1989 births
Living people
21st-century British male actors
Alumni of RADA
Audiobook narrators
Best Musical or Comedy Actor Golden Globe (film) winners
National Youth Theatre members
People educated at Ysgol Penglais School
People from Aberystwyth
People from Birkenhead
Welsh male film actors
Welsh male television actors
Welsh male voice actors
Welsh people of English descent
Welsh-speaking actors